Albert Serra Figueras (born 6 October 1978) is a Spanish retired footballer who played as a central defender.

Club career
Born in Banyoles, Girona, Catalonia, Serra started his professional career at local UE Figueres in 2000, quickly becoming a regular for the Segunda División B team. After five seasons, he signed with neighbouring Girona FC in the Tercera División.

Girona promoted in 2007, and climbed yet another division the next year, with Serra playing 33 matches. He remained first-choice the following campaign in the Segunda División, but the club's president decided not to renew the player's contract, and he eventually moved to another side in that tier, Levante UD.

After one single season, where he featured in less than half of the matches as the Valencians returned to La Liga, the 32-year-old Serra rejoined Girona. In 2011 he signed for UE Olot also in his native region, retiring three years later.

References

External links

1978 births
Living people
People from Pla de l'Estany
Sportspeople from the Province of Girona
Spanish footballers
Footballers from Catalonia
Association football defenders
Segunda División players
Segunda División B players
Tercera División players
UE Figueres footballers
Girona FC players
Levante UD footballers
UE Olot players